Nyree Elise Kindred MBE (née Lewis; born 21 September 1980 in Rhondda, Wales) is a Welsh swimmer who has competed in the Paralympic Games on four occasions winning ten medals.

Early life

Kindred took up swimming at the age of 5, having been taken to a swimming pool by her aunt. Kindred has a form of cerebral palsy and therefore competes in the S6 (butterfly, backstroke, freestyle), SM6 (medley) and SB5 (breaststroke) classifications.

Paralympic career

Kindred's first appearance at a Paralympics came at the 2000 Games in Sydney, where she won 3 medals, 2 silver and a bronze.

At the 2004 Summer Paralympics Kindred won her first Paralympic gold medal in the S6 100 metres backstroke event, in a new Paralympic record time of 1:32.03. She followed this up with another gold in the 4×50 m medley 20 pts relay, silver medals in both the 100 m breaststroke SB5 and 200 m SM6 individual medley, and a bronze in the 400 m freestyle S6.

In the 100 metres S6 backstroke at the 2008 Paralympic Games in Beijing Kindred was beaten into second place by Dutch swimmer Mirjam de Koning-Peper. Kindred explained her defeat by saying "My legs were spasming, but to be honest, there are no excuses for that, ... I should have gone quicker but it just wasn't there tonight". In addition to this medal winning performance Kindred also reached the finals of the 100 m breaststroke SB5 (finishing 4th), 200 m SM6 individual medley (finishing 6th) and 400 m freestyle S6 (finishing 6th). In April 2012 she qualified for the 2012 Summer Paralympics in the S6 100m backstroke. In the final she finished second to collect the silver medal with a time of 1:26.23.

On top of her success at the Paralympics, Kindred has won seven International Paralympic Committee World Championship medals and seven European Championship medals.

Personal life
Kindred's husband is fellow British Paralympic gold medal-winning swimmer Sascha Kindred. Together the pair, who live in Herefordshire, are known as the "golden couple" of British disability swimming. The couple's first child, Ella, was born in 2011. Kindred was appointed Member of the Order of the British Empire (MBE) in the 2009 Birthday Honours for services to disability sport.

See also
List of Paralympic records in swimming
Great Britain at the 2008 Summer Paralympics
Swimming at the 2000 Summer Paralympics
Swimming at the 2004 Summer Paralympics
Swimming at the 2008 Summer Paralympics

Notes

External links
 
 
 

1980 births
Living people
Welsh female swimmers
Paralympic swimmers of Great Britain
Swimmers at the 2000 Summer Paralympics
Swimmers at the 2004 Summer Paralympics
Swimmers at the 2008 Summer Paralympics
Paralympic gold medalists for Great Britain
Paralympic silver medalists for Great Britain
Paralympic bronze medalists for Great Britain
World record holders in paralympic swimming
Members of the Order of the British Empire
People from Rhondda
Swimmers at the 2012 Summer Paralympics
Female backstroke swimmers
Female medley swimmers
Welsh female freestyle swimmers
Female breaststroke swimmers
Cerebral Palsy category Paralympic competitors
Medalists at the 2000 Summer Paralympics
Medalists at the 2004 Summer Paralympics
Medalists at the 2008 Summer Paralympics
Medalists at the 2012 Summer Paralympics
S6-classified Paralympic swimmers
Welsh Paralympic competitors
Team Bath swimmers
Team Bath Paralympic athletes
Medalists at the World Para Swimming Championships
Medalists at the World Para Swimming European Championships
Paralympic medalists in swimming